Earl Henry "Gibby" Pruess (April 2, 1895 – August 28, 1979) was an American Major League Baseball right fielder who played in one game for the St. Louis Browns on September 15, . He walked in his only plate appearance.

External links
Baseball Reference.com

1895 births
1979 deaths
St. Louis Browns players
Baseball players from Chicago
Major League Baseball right fielders